Santiago Atitlán (from Nahuatl atitlan, "at the water", in Tz'utujil Tz'ikin Jaay, "birdhouse") is a municipality in the Sololá department of Guatemala. The town sits on a bay of Lake Atitlán between two volcanoes. Santiago Atitlan is southwest of Panajachel across the lake. Major highways reach Lake Atitlán at San Lucas Toliman and Panajachel. A road links Santiago to San Lucas Tolliman. Boats connect the numerous communities around the lake.

The majority of the residents are indigenous Maya. It was the capital of the Tz'utujil people in pre-Columbian times and its name was Chuitinamit.

Santiago Atitlán is the home of the Cojolya Weaving Center and Museum, founded by the Cojolya Association of Maya Women Weavers. The museum shows the history, tradition, and process of backstrap-loom weaving, the evolution of the traditional costume of the Tzutujil, and tells about the indigenous people of Santiago Atitlán.
 
Santiago Atitlán was the site of considerable state-sponsored violence during the country's civil war. Some of the most notable incidents that occurred during the war include the assassination of Roman Catholic priest Stanley Rother by right-wing death squads on 28 July 1981, and the massacre of 14 people (and wounding of 21 others) when the Guatemalan Army opened fire on a crowd of unarmed civilians on 2 December 1990.

References

External links
 
 Cojolya Weaving Center and Museum
 

Municipalities of the Sololá Department
Tz'utujil people